Paleobiology is a scientific journal promoting the integration of biology and conventional paleontology, with emphasis placed on biological or paleobiological processes and patterns. It attracts papers of interest to more than one discipline, and occasionally publishes research on recent organisms when this is of interest to paleontologists.

Paleontology journals
Academic journals published by learned and professional societies
Publications established in 1975
Quarterly journals
English-language journals
Paleobiology
Cambridge University Press academic journals